In mathematics, the Lebesgue covering dimension or topological dimension of a topological space is one of several different ways of defining the dimension of the space in a
topologically invariant way.

Informal discussion
For ordinary Euclidean spaces, the Lebesgue covering dimension is just the ordinary Euclidean dimension: zero for points, one for lines, two for planes, and so on. However, not all topological spaces have this kind of "obvious" dimension, and so a precise definition is needed in such cases. The definition proceeds by examining what happens when the space is covered by open sets.

In general, a topological space X can be covered by open sets, in that one can find a collection of open sets such that X lies inside of their union. The covering dimension is the smallest number n such that for every cover, there is a refinement in which every point in X lies in the intersection of no more than n + 1 covering sets. This is the gist of the formal definition below. The goal of the definition is to provide a number (an integer) that describes the space, and does not change as the space is continuously deformed; that is, a number that is invariant under homeomorphisms. 

The general idea is illustrated in the diagrams below, which show a cover and refinements of a circle and a square.

Formal definition
 
The first formal definition of covering dimension was given by Eduard Čech, based on an earlier result of Henri Lebesgue.

A modern definition is as follows. An open cover of a topological space  is a family of open sets  such that their union is the whole space,   = . The order or ply of an open cover  = {} is the smallest number  (if it exists) for which each point of the space belongs to at most  open sets in the cover: in other words 1 ∩ ⋅⋅⋅ ∩ +1 =  for 1, ..., +1 distinct. The covering dimension of a topological space  is defined to be the minimum value of  such that every finite open cover  of X has an open refinement  with order  + 1. Thus, if  is finite, 1 ∩ ⋅⋅⋅ ∩ +2 =  for 1, ..., +2 distinct. If no such minimal  exists, the space is said to have infinite covering dimension.

As a special case, a non-empty topological space is zero-dimensional with respect to the covering dimension if every open cover of the space has a refinement consisting of disjoint open sets so that any point in the space is contained in exactly one open set of this refinement.

The empty set has covering dimension -1: for any open cover of the empty set, each point of the empty set is not contained in any element of the cover, so the order of any open cover is 0.

Examples
Any given open cover of the unit circle will have a refinement consisting of a collection of open arcs. The circle has dimension one, by this definition, because any such cover can be further refined to the stage where a given point x of the circle is contained in at most two open arcs. That is, whatever collection of arcs we begin with, some can be discarded or shrunk, such that the remainder still covers the circle but with simple overlaps.

Similarly, any open cover of the unit disk in the two-dimensional plane can be refined so that any point of the disk is contained in no more than three open sets, while two are in general not sufficient. The covering dimension of the disk is thus two.

More generally, the n-dimensional Euclidean space  has covering dimension n.

Properties
Homeomorphic spaces have the same covering dimension. That is, the covering dimension is a topological invariant.
Here,  is the n-dimensional sphere.
 Ostrand's theorem on colored dimension. , ⊆ , and together covering .

Relationships to other notions of dimension

In particular, this holds for all metric spaces.
Lebesgue covering theorem. The Lebesgue covering dimension coincides with the affine dimension of a finite simplicial complex.
The covering dimension of a normal space is less than or equal to the large inductive dimension.
 In a metric space, one can strengthen the notion of the multiplicity of a cover: a cover has -multiplicity  if every -ball intersects with at most  sets in the cover.  This idea leads to the definitions of the asymptotic dimension and Assouad–Nagata dimension of a space: a space with asymptotic dimension  is -dimensional "at large scales", and a space with Assouad–Nagata dimension  is -dimensional "at every scale".

See also
 Carathéodory's extension theorem
 Geometric set cover problem
 Dimension theory
 Metacompact space
 Point-finite collection

Notes

References

Further reading

Historical
 Karl Menger, General Spaces and Cartesian Spaces, (1926) Communications to the Amsterdam Academy of Sciences. English translation reprinted in Classics on Fractals, Gerald A.Edgar, editor, Addison-Wesley (1993) 
 Karl Menger, Dimensionstheorie, (1928) B.G Teubner Publishers, Leipzig.

Modern 
 
 V. V. Fedorchuk, The Fundamentals of Dimension Theory, appearing in Encyclopaedia of Mathematical Sciences, Volume 17, General Topology I, (1993) A. V. Arkhangel'skii and L. S. Pontryagin (Eds.), Springer-Verlag, Berlin .

External links
 

Dimension theory